The 2019–20 Bangladesh Cricket League was the eighth edition of the Bangladesh Cricket League, a first-class cricket competition. It was held in Bangladesh, running from 31 January to 24 February 2020. The tournament had a smaller set of fixtures than previous editions to accommodate the 2019–20 Dhaka Premier Division Cricket League, and was used as preparation for the first Test match against the Pakistan cricket team. South Zone were the defending champions.

In the opening round of matches Tamim Iqbal, batting for East Zone, made the highest score in first-class cricket by a Bangladeshi batsman, with 334 not out. In the final round of matches, South Zone made an unusual declaration, with their score at 114/4, thinking they would prevent Central Zone from earning bonus points and ensuring that they progressed to the final. However, they made a mistake in the points calculation, but still managed to progress after the match was drawn. East Zone also progressed to the final, following their eight wicket win against North Zone.

On 16 February 2020, the Bangladesh Cricket Board (BCB) announced that the final would be scheduled to be played across five days, starting on 22 February, unlike the usual four-day matches that were used in the rest of the tournament. South Zone won the tournament, after they beat East Zone by 105 runs in the final.

Points table

Fixtures

Round 1

Round 2

Round 3

Final

References

External links
 Series home at ESPN Cricinfo

2019-20
Bangladesh Cricket League
2020 in Bangladeshi cricket
Bangladeshi cricket seasons from 2000–01